Harry Joseph Lennix III (born November 16, 1964) is an American actor. He is known for his roles as Terrence "Dresser" Williams in the Robert Townsend film The Five Heartbeats (1991) and as Boyd Langton in the science-fiction series Dollhouse. Lennix co-stars as Harold Cooper, assistant director of the FBI Counterterrorism Division, on the NBC drama The Blacklist. Lennix has also played J'onn J'onzz / Martian Manhunter in the DC Extended Universe films Man of Steel, Batman v Superman: Dawn of Justice, and Zack Snyder's Justice League and will reprise the role in The Flash.

Early life
The youngest of four siblings, Lennix was born in Chicago, Illinois, to Lillian C. (née Vines), a laundress, and Harry Lennix Jr., a machinist. His mother was African-American and his father was Creole from Louisiana. Lennix attended Quigley Preparatory Seminary South and Northwestern University, where he majored in Acting and Direction. In his senior year at Northwestern, he was the coordinator of the African-American student organization, For Members Only.

Career
Lennix currently co-stars as Harold Cooper, assistant director of the FBI Counterterrorism Division, on the NBC drama The Blacklist, which debuted September 23, 2013.

In film, Lennix has had supporting roles such as The Five Heartbeats (1991), Comfortably Numb (1995), Get on the Bus (1996), Love & Basketball (2000), The Matrix series (1999–2004), Ray (2004), Barbershop 2: Back in Business (2004), Stomp the Yard (2007), and State of Play (2009).

In television, he had a recurring role in Diagnosis: Murder as Agent Ron Wagner as well as a voice-over role in the Legion of Super Heroes animated series. He also had a recurring role in the sixth season of 24 as fictional Muslim civil rights activist Walid Al-Rezani. He appeared on the series House M.D. as a paralyzed jazz trumpet player, and in six episodes of ER as Dr. Greg Fischer. He also appeared in the episode "The Blame Game" of the first season of Ally McBeal.  He played the parts of Boyd Langton in Joss Whedon's series Dollhouse and U.S. president Barack Obama in the comedy sketch show Little Britain USA.

In 2007, he was an official festival judge at the first annual Noor Iranian Film Festival.

In July 2014, he formed his own production company Exponent Media Group (EMG) along with long time business partner Steve Harris. EMG had a distribution deal with NEHST studios for three of the company's titles Mr. Sophistication, H4 (a street version of William Shakespeare's Henry IV, which he also starred in), and Revival!

Personal life
In 2009, Lennix married business executive Djena Graves.

Lennix is a member of the Omega Psi Phi fraternity. He was initiated into the fraternity in November 2012 via the Theta Kappa Kappa graduate chapter in Evanston, Illinois.

Lennix is a Catholic. In 2021, he told Page Six that he had studied to become a Catholic priest with the Dominicans:"(He said) all that theological training was not in vain as it has helped him become a better actor....You have to be able to answer people’s questions,” “The Matrix Reloaded” star told Page Six. “Those questions are sometimes quite profound and require a great deal of thought and preparation to answer.”

Filmography

Film

Television

Video Games

Awards and nominations

References

External links
 
 
 
 

1964 births
Living people
20th-century American male actors
21st-century American male actors
Male actors from Chicago
American male film actors
Louisiana Creole people
Northwestern University School of Communication alumni
African-American male actors
American male television actors
African-American Catholics
20th-century African-American people
21st-century African-American people